Abraham Jacob Hirschfeld (December 20, 1919 – August 9, 2005) was an American real estate investor, Broadway producer and political candidate from New York City. He was the owner of several buildings in Manhattan. He served as treasurer for the New York State Democratic Committee in the 1960s and as city commissioner of Miami Beach, Florida in 1989.

Early life
Abraham Jacob Hirschfeld was born on December 20, 1919 in Tarnów, Poland. He immigrated to the British Mandate of Palestine in the early 1930s. He said most of his extended family remained behind and were murdered in the Holocaust. Hirschfeld moved to the United States in 1950. His brother, Menashe Hirschfeld, moved to Montreal, Quebec, Canada.

Business career
Hirschfeld made his fortune building semi-enclosed "open-air" parking garages.

Hirschfeld became the owner of the Vertical Club, a health club on the Upper East Side. He was a co-owner of the Hotel Pennsylvania. Additionally, he was an investor in the Crowne Plaza Hotel, Times Square.

In 1989, he funded the Broadway show Prince of Central Park and the Jackie Mason show, Love Thy Neighbor.

In March 1993, Hirschfeld was the court-appointed manager of New York Post for two weeks after the paper filed for bankruptcy. During that period of time, he dismissed editor Pete Hamill, but later upon court order reinstated him and was shown kissing his face in a famous picture. After his New York Post failure, he founded Open Air PM.

Political career
Throughout his career, Hirschfeld ran for political office several times, including unsuccessful bids as "Honest Abe" for the U.S. Senate in 1974 (defeated in Democratic primary), for New York City Council President in 1977, for Manhattan Borough President in 1997, for Lieutenant Governor of New York, for New York State Comptroller in 1998, and for Mayor of Miami Beach, Florida.

Hirschfeld served as treasurer for the New York State Democratic Committee in the 1960s and was elected to the City Commission of Miami Beach in 1989. In 1990, the Miami Beach City Commission censured its colleague Hirschfeld for spitting twice on a Miami Herald reporter, and censured him again in 1991 for telling an ethnic joke at a commission meeting.

In September 1987, Hirschfeld launched an unsuccessful campaign in Miami Beach to draft New York developer Donald Trump for president.

In 2004, Hirschfeld ran as a third-party candidate for the U.S. Senate from New York against Charles Schumer; Schumer won 71% of the vote, Hirschfeld garnered less than 1%.

Lawsuits
In 1998, Hirschfeld offered US$1,000,000 to Paula Jones to drop her sexual harassment lawsuit against former US President Bill Clinton.

In 1999, Hirschfeld was cleared of charges he owed US$3.3 million in taxes.

In 2000, Hirschfeld was indicted of criminal solicitation for trying to hire a hit man to kill his former business partner Stanley Stahl, with whom he had a "survivor take all" business partnership. Hirschfeld was sentenced to three years in prison, of which he served two. When he got out of prison he ran for the U.S. Senate, calling himself "Honest Abe".

Personal life
Hirschfeld married Zipora Teicher Hirschfeld in 1943. They had a son, Elie Hirschfeld, and a daughter, Rachel Hirschfeld.

Death and legacy
Hirschfeld died at age 85 on August 9, 2005 at the St. Barnabas Hospital in The Bronx, of cardiac arrest stemming from complications of a battle with terminal cancer. In 2013, his daughter accused her brother of stealing US$300 million from the estate.

References

External links 
 Official bio

1919 births
2005 deaths
American people of Polish-Jewish descent
American real estate businesspeople
Businesspeople from New York City
Deaths from cancer in New York (state)
Jewish American people in Florida politics
People convicted of soliciting murder
People from Tarnów
Polish emigrants to the United States
American businesspeople convicted of crimes
Jewish American people in New York (state) politics
20th-century American businesspeople
20th-century American Jews
21st-century American Jews